The Nikon AF-S 17-55mm f/2.8 G IF-ED DX was announced in 2004. It is a F-mount professional zoom lens with a constant fast aperture of f/2.8 designed for Nikon DX digital SLR cameras.  Nikon have incorporated their Silent Wave Motor for silent auto focusing.  The lens is made mostly of metal and the rubber sealed rear
mount makes the lens partially dust and water resistant. Dimensions of the lens are 
85.5 x 110.5mm.  The filter size is 77mm and the lens weighs 755g.

Specifications

See also
 List of Nikon compatible lenses with integrated autofocus-motor
 Nikon DX format

References
 http://www.nikon.com.au/en_AU/product_details.Nikkor17-55mm%20f2.8G%20IF-ED.
 http://store.mynikonlife.com.au/nikkor-lenses/nikkor-dx.html
 nikonusa./AF-S-DX-Zoom-Nikkor-17-55mm-2F2.8G-IF-ED.l

Nikon F-mount lenses
Camera lenses introduced in 2004